Jennifer Williams is an American diplomat.

Jennifer Williams may also refer to:

People
Jennifer Williams (gymnast), Swedish artistic gymnast
Jen Williams, British writer
Jennifer Williams, American television personality (Basketball Wives)

Characters
Jennifer Williams (The Grudge), a character of the 2004 horror film The Grudge, played by Clea DuVall